Ajka Crystal is a Hungarian crystal manufacturer. Created in 1878 by Bernard Neumann. The company, one of the biggest in Central Europe produces unique, handmade pieces of glass art. Ajka Crystal also goes under the name of "The Romanov Collection" in the United States. Ajka Crystal ships 90% of the factory's total production - both in tableware (stemware, tumblers etc...) and in giftware (vases, bowls) is exported for world-famous brands such as Wedgwood, Tiffany's, Rosenthal, Waterford Crystal, Polo Ralph Lauren, Christian Dior, Moser and other high end French Crystal Manufacturers.

Ajka Crystal is located in Ajka, Hungary.

Ajka Crystal's online webshop (www.ajka-crystal.com) was established in 2003, with the widest selection of lead crystal products for both retail and wholesale.

References

Glassmaking companies
Manufacturing companies of Hungary
Hungarian brands
Glass trademarks and brands
Veszprém County
1895 establishments in Austria-Hungary